Ameivula jalapensis is a species of teiid lizard endemic to Brazil.

References

jalapensis
Reptiles described in 2009
Lizards of South America
Reptiles of Brazil
Taxa named by Guarino R. Colli
Taxa named by Lilian G. Giugliano
Taxa named by Daniel O. Mesquita
Taxa named by Frederico G. R. França